Anastasiya Yakimova was the defending champion, having won the event in 2011, but chose not to participate in 2012.

Hsieh Su-wei won the title, defeating Zhang Shuai in the final, 6–2, 6–2.

Seeds

Main draw

Finals

Top half

Bottom half

References 
 Main Draw
 Qualifying Draw

Ningbo Challenger - Women's Singles